"Strictly Physical" is a song by German pop girl group Monrose. It was written by British musicians Tim Hawes, Pete Kirtley, Obi Mhondera, Christian Ballard, and Andrew Murray and recorded by the trio for their same-titled second studio album (2007). Production was helmed by Mhondera along with duo Hawes and Kirtley as well as duo Ballard and Murray under their production monikers Jiant and Snowflakers. A dark and spooky, synthesizer–driven contemporary R&B record, it contains lyrics that reference to a celebration of sexual lust and conquest, leading up to a desire to get physical with a love interest.

The song was selected as the second single from its parent album and released one week ahead of Strictly Physical in September 2007. It earned generally positive reviews from critics who compared it favorably to Canadian singer Nelly Furtado's song "Say It Right" (2006). Commercially, "Strictly Physical" peaked at number six on the German Singles Chart, becoming the band's fourth consecutive single to do so, and reached the top twenty and thirty in Austria and Switzerland, respectively. For the accompanying music video which depicts the band during a photo shooting and in a boxing hall, Monrose reteamed with "Shame" director Oliver Sommer.

Background
A thirty-seconds clip of "Strictly Physical" was previewed on 27 August 2007 on the band's official website, and by 3 September the full track had leaked to the Internet via radio.

Music video

The music video for "Strictly Physical" was filmed between 27–29 August 2007 in Germany. It premiered on the band's official website on 12 September and made its television debut the following day on German music network VIVA's show VIVA Live.

At the beginning of the video, Bahar Kızıl, who is standing in front of a mirror, Senna Gammour, who is lying on a bed, and Mandy Capristo, who is sitting on a chair, are posing for a photographer in a photoshoot.
They are dressed in light colored clothing, mostly white. The girls show discontent with the photos and storm out, leaving the photographer behind.
In the following scenes they travel to what is presumably a boxing ring or gym. They are now shown dressed in male clothing. Monrose changes the roles, acting as three photographers with three men. Intercut with these plots are shots of the three women dressed in black and red latex outfits.

Track listings

Credits and personnel
Credits adapted from the liner notes of Strictly Physical.

Christian Ballard – choir, drums, keyboards, mixing, production, writing
Mandy Capristo – vocals
Dan Frampton – mixing
Senna Gammour – vocals
Tim Hawes – production, writing

Pete Kirtley – bass, production, writing 
Bahar Kizil – vocals 
Obi Mhondera – production, writing
Andrew Murray – choir, keyboards, production, writing
Claus Üblacker – engineering

Charts

Weekly charts

Year-end charts

References

2007 singles
Dance-pop songs
Monrose songs
Songs written by Pete Kirtley
Songs written by Obi Mhondera
Songs written by Tim Hawes
Songs written by Christian Ballard (songwriter)
2007 songs